Sri Tadbund Veeranjaneya Swamy temple is an old Hindu temple located in Sikh Village in Secunderabad. It is very popular with the devotees of Lord Hanuman.

External links
 Temple website

References

Hindu temples in Hyderabad, India